Victoria College, Alexandria, was founded in 1902 under the impetus of the recently ennobled Evelyn Baring, 1st Earl of Cromer of the Barings Bank, that was heavily invested in Egyptian stability. For years the British Consul-General was ex officio on the board of Victoria College. The new college was to raise the standard of Imperial education and free it from the influences of the madrassas and the ubiquitous Jesuits, both of whom made the British foreign office uneasy. Among prominent subscribers to the project were members of the prominent internationalized Jewish and Maltese minority in Egypt including members of the Egyptian Royal family. Prior to the 1930s establishment of Baghdad College, members of the upper class of Iraq sent their children to Victoria College.

During World War II, many displaced European royals and nobles were added to the student body:
" As the situation worsened north of the Mediterranean, scions of European monarchies expanded the student body further so that Romanovs, Saxe-Coburgs, Hohenzollerns, Zogos and Glucksburgs rubbed shoulders with the Hashemites, Mahdis and al-Sharifs. While most were treated like regular students some stood out because of restrictions imposed upon them. The Albanian royals, the Zogos, for instance, were constantly trailed by massive bodyguards, which is perhaps why they did not last long at Victoria. Years later, many among the Arab elite students would meet again this time as major players in rising petrodollar economies." (Samir Raafat)

The British Imperial-outpost phase of Victoria College ended abruptly in 1956, the year that began with the dissolution of Anglo-Egyptian cooperation and saw the Suez Crisis in October. The entire British faculty was fired, including then headmaster Herbert Barritt. The school was renamed later to "Victory College" and continues to operate until this day.

At Victoria College on El Iqbal Street, former Bulgarian King and Prime Minister Simeon Saxe-Coburg-Gotha attended classes along with schoolmates such as King Hussein of Jordan, Zaid Al Rifai, the Kashoggi brothers (whose father was one of Saudi King Abdulaziz's physicians), Kamal Adham (who ran the Saudi external intelligence directorate under King Faisal), scholar Edward Said, present-day Saudi businessmen Mohammed Al Attas, Ambassador  Mohamed Faqi and Ambassador  Fouad Faqi.Shobokshi brothers  and Ghassan Shaker  —Internationally famous director Youssef Chahine, and  actor Omar Sharif and many Princes from the Libyan Royal family and the Jordanian Royal Family.

Notable alumni

 André Aciman
 Abd Al-Ilah, Crown Prince of Iraq
 Adnan Pachachi
 Ahmed Ramzy, the Egyptian actor
 Charles Issawi
 Edward Said, public intellectual and author of Orientalism
 Edward Atiyah
 Evangelos Christou
 George Antonius
 Gilbert de Botton
 Hussein I of Jordan
 Jani Christou
 Jassem Al-Kharafi
 Abdullah Al-Nafisi
 Adnan Kashoggi
 Leka, Crown Prince of Albania
 Michael Francis Atiyah 
 Omar Sharif, the Egyptian actor
 Osman Selaheddin Osmanoğlu
 Patrick Atiyah
 Ra'ad bin Zeid
 Ramzy Ezzeldin Ramzy
 Sammy Sheik
 Samir Sabri
AlSadiq AlMahdi, twice-elected prime minister of Sudan
 Simeon II of Bulgaria
Wafik S. El-Deiry (Physician-Scientist)
 Youssef Chahine
 Zaid Al-Rifai
 Zaid Ibn Shaker
 Foulath Hadid
 Hazem Khattab

References

External links

Old Victorians Association Egypt 
 The Victorian.net
 «Victoria College: educating the elite, 1902 − 1956» by Samir Raafat (detailed illustrated history)
 VC letters

1902 establishments in Egypt
Educational institutions established in 1902
Private schools in Alexandria
British international schools in Egypt
International schools in Alexandria
Victoria College, Alexandria alumni